Ernest Alfred Linton Wakely (born November 27, 1940) is a Canadian former professional ice hockey goaltender.

Career 
Wakely was a goaltender in the National Hockey League (NHL) for the Montreal Canadiens and St. Louis Blues. He also played for the Quebec Aces, the Cleveland Barons (AHL), Winnipeg Jets, San Diego Mariners, Cincinnati Stingers, Houston Aeros, Houston Apollos, and Birmingham Bulls of the World Hockey Association. Wakely was goaltender for the 1958–59 Memorial Cup-winning Winnipeg Braves of the MJHL.

In the 1969–70 NHL season Wakely took over in St. Louis for Glenn Hall. Wakely appeared in 30 games, won 12, and recorded a NHL league leading goals against average of 2.11 in leading the Blues to the Stanley Cup Final against the Boston Bruins. Although Wakely did not start the first game of the finals, he replaced Jacques Plante early in the game after Plante was injured. Wakely played well through the second period, but Boston prevailed in that game 6–1 and swept the Blues in four straight games to win the Stanley Cup.

The following season, Wakely played in 51 games, won 20, and posted a 2.79 GAA. Two years later, he played with the Winnipeg Jets and former Chicago Black Hawks star Bobby Hull in the World Hockey Association. No other goalie played more games in the WHA and his 16 shutouts are also a WHA career record.

Awards and achievements
Turnbull Cup MJHL Championship (1959)
Memorial Cup Championship (1959)
MJHL Top Goaltender (1961)
CPHL Championship (1964)
 engraved on the Stanley Cup in 1965, 1968 with Montreal (Only dressed for two games in playoffs did not play)
"Honoured Member" of the Manitoba Hockey Hall of Fame
Inaugural member of the World Hockey Association Hall of Fame (2010)

Career statistics

Regular season and playoffs

References

External links

Ernie Wakely's biography at Manitoba Hockey Hall of Fame

1940 births
Living people
Birmingham Bulls players
Cincinnati Stingers players
Cleveland Barons (1937–1973) players
Houston Aeros (WHA) players
Seattle Totems (WHL) players
Spokane Comets players
Sportspeople from Flin Flon
Montreal Canadiens players
Quebec Aces (AHL) players
St. Louis Blues players
San Diego Mariners players
Stanley Cup champions
Winnipeg Braves players
Winnipeg Jets (WHA) players
Winnipeg Warriors (minor pro) players
Ice hockey people from Manitoba
Canadian ice hockey goaltenders